The annual New Zealand Open Dance Championship is run by the NZ Federation of Dance Teachers.

The competition has been held annually from 1950 in New Zealand.

This is a Freedom to Dance event.

See also 
New Vogue (dance)
Dancesport World Champions (Ten Dance)
Dancesport World Champions (Professional Standard)
Dancesport World Champions (Professional Latin)

References

External links
New Zealand Open Dance Championship 2019 Dancesport Info
Dancesport Info

Ballroom dance competitions
Dancesport competitions
Dance in New Zealand
Recurring events established in 1950